Mr. Vampire II, (Chinese: 殭屍家族) also known as Mr. Vampire Part 2, is a 1986 Hong Kong comedy horror film directed by Ricky Lau, starring Yuen Biao, Moon Lee and Lam Ching-ying, and produced by Sammo Hung. The film is the second of a series of five films directed by Ricky Lau in the Mr. Vampire franchise. Mr. Vampire and its sequels were released as part of the jiangshi cinematic boom in Hong Kong during the 1980s. The Chinese title of the film literally translates to "Vampire Family".

Plot
Archaeologist Kwok Tun-Wong brings his two students with him in search of ancient artifacts. They stumble upon a cave and discover three geung si (Chinese "hopping" vampires)—an adult male, an adult female, and a child male. The vampires are immobilized because they have Chinese talismans with spells written on them stuck to their foreheads. Kwok brings them back to his lab and decides to sell the boy vampire in the black market.

While transporting the boy vampire, Kwok accidentally strips the talisman off its forehead and breaks the charm. The creature awakens and escapes. It enters a house by chance and befriends a little girl, who mistakes the young vampire for an illegal immigrant boy. Meanwhile, back in the lab, one of Kwok's students mischievously removes the talismans from the adult vampires and revives them. The vampires start to "hop" around and attack people. It took the three men much trouble to put them back to rest temporarily.

One of Kwok's students was bitten by the male vampire while fighting it so he goes to see Dr. Lam for treatment. Lam recognises the bite marks and concludes that there are vampires running loose in town. Together with his daughter Gigi and his prospective son-in-law Yen, Lam embarks on a quest to destroy the vampires.

Dr. Lam tells Yen and Gigi to follow Kwok’s student back to the lab. When they arrive, they wait for Kwok and his students to leave looking for the child vampire and Yen enters the lab. He instructs Gigi to go outside and call the police. Yen accidentally removed the talisman on the vampire’s forehead while trying to take a picture for the newspapers. A fight breaks out between Yen and the two vampires. Eventually Lam and Gigi arrive to try to fend off the vampires. After a long fight they were able to put the vampires to sleep with sedatives from the lab. The police arrive right after and take the bodies of the two vampires to the morgue in the police station.

Lam and Yen sneak into the morgue and try to kill the vampires with a wooden sword but fail. Kwok and his students also arrive at the morgue because his student needs to get the blood of one of the vampires to cure himself from becoming one after he was bitten. Lam and Yen pretend to be corpses while Kwok and his students carry the vampires out. They put the bodies in the back of a truck while Lam and Yen snuck into the driver seat and hijacked the truck. Later they are stopped by police officers at a roadblock and the two vampires escape. The child vampire at home sees the two adult vampires escaping on the news and he lets out a loud cry that alerts the vampires to his location.

Lam and Yen hear on their radio that there’s two vampire sightings and they arrive at the children’s house. With the help of the police, Lam and Yen are able to kill the two adult vampires but seeing how the children loved the child vampire, Yen decides to inject it with anesthetics instead of killing it. He dresses up the vampire in children’s clothes and sneakily carries it out of the house without the police noticing. Kwok arrives and falls to the ground. His students stand behind him, revealing that they have become vampires after they were unable to get a sample of vampire blood to cure themselves.

Cast
Lam Ching-ying as Dr Lam Ching-ying (林正英), a physician who is also skilled in Chinese supernatural arts
Yuen Biao as Yen (夏友仁), a reporter and Lam's prospective son-in-law
Moon Lee as Gigi, Lam's daughter
Chung Fat as Professor Kwok Tun-wong (郭敦煌), the archaeologist who discovers the vampires
Billy Lau as Chicken, Kwok's student
Ka Lee as Sashimi, Kwok's student
Agassi Wang as the female adult vampire
Cheung Wing-cheung as the male adult vampire
Hoh Kin-wai as the boy vampire
Hon To-yue as Chia-chia, the girl who befriends the boy vampire
Choi Man-gam as Chia-chia's brother
Bowie Wu as Mr Hu, Chia-chia's father
Wu Ma as Mr Hu's neighbour
Hsiao Ho as a lab technician
James Tien as a police officer
Cho Tat-wah as the police chief
Manfred Wong as a coroner
Yuen Miu as a policeman
Stanley Fung as an archaeologist
Ban Yun-sang as a policeman at the traffic checkpoint
Chow Gam-kong as a policeman
Yiu Yau-hung as a fireman
Lee Chi-git as Ping
Lam Gwok-hung
Yeung Ming

Home media

VHS

Laserdisc

VCD

DVD

Blu-ray

References

External links
 
 
 Mr. Vampire II at Hong Kong Cinemagic
 Mr. Vampire II on lovehkfilm.com
 Audio Commentary from Podcast on Fire

1986 films
1986 horror films
Hong Kong action comedy films
Hong Kong martial arts films
Hong Kong horror films
1980s comedy horror films
1986 action films
1986 martial arts films
Mr. Vampire
Jiangshi films
Golden Harvest films
Martial arts horror films
Martial arts comedy films
Films set in Hong Kong
Films shot in Hong Kong
Vampire comedy films
1986 comedy films
1980s Hong Kong films